Inventing the Market: Smith, Hegel, and Political Theory is a 2013 book by Lisa Herzog in which the author tries to examine the constructions of the market in the philosophy of Adam Smith and Georg Wilhelm Friedrich Hegel.

Reception
The book was reviewed by Markus Oliver Spitz, Michael Schleeter, Vivienne Brown and Arash Abazari.

See also
Hegel's Ontology of Power

References

External links 
 Inventing the Market: Smith, Hegel, and Political Theory

2013 non-fiction books
Oxford University Press books
English-language books
Books about Georg Wilhelm Friedrich Hegel
Adam Smith
Economics books
Books about capitalism